Ailsacrinus is an extinct genus of crinoid from the Middle Jurassic of Europe.

References

 Fossils (Smithsonian Handbooks) by David Ward (Page 174)

Millericrinida
Jurassic crinoids
Jurassic animals of Europe
Middle Jurassic animals
Middle Jurassic Europe
Prehistoric echinoderms of Europe